The Battle of Kupres was a battle fought in 1942 during World War 2 in Independent State of Croatia between the forces of the Independent State of Croatia and the Yugoslav Partisans, in and around the town of Kupres in western Bosnia. The Partisans launched three concentrated attacks against the garrison of 1,500 men during the nights of 11/12 August, 14 August and 19 August. Although outnumbered, the Black Legion, Croatian Home Guard and local militia units successfully defended the town against several Partisan brigades.

Background

In July 1942, the 2nd Proletarian Brigade moved on Kupres and, with the assistance of local Partisans, seized control over several villages in the vicinity. During the night of 4 August 1942 the Partisans attacked the town of Livno and captured it in the following days. The plan of the National Liberation Army Supreme Command, following the seizure of Livno, was to move the Proletarian Assault Brigades to Kupres, whose capture was vital for further actions in the valley of River Vrbas.

The battle

 Yugoslav Partisans 11/12 August 1942, 13 battalions with around 2,100 men

2nd Proletarian Brigade
3rd Proletarian (Sandžak) Brigade
4th Proletarian (Montenegrin) Brigade
10th Herzegovinian Brigade
3rd Krajina NOP Detachment

14 August 1942, 16 battalions with around 2,400 - 3,000 men

2nd Proletarian Brigade
3rd Proletarian (Sandžak) Brigade
4th Proletarian (Montenegrin) Brigade
10th Herzegovinian Brigade
1st Krajina Brigade
3rd Krajina NOP Detachment

 11/12 August 1942, in total around 1,400 men
Black Legion
Kupres Militia
XVII Ustaša Battalion
9th Artillery Battalion
9th Infantry Regiment
5th Gendarmerie Regiment

14 August 1942, around 1,500 armed men
Black Legion
Kupres Militia
XVII Ustaša Battalion
9th Artillery Battalion
9th Infantry Regiment
5th Gendarmerie Regiment
14th Infantry Regiment

References 

 

Kupres 1942
Kupres 1942
Kupres 1942
Independent State of Croatia
Kupres 1942
Kupres 1942
Kupres 1942
1942 in Yugoslavia
July 1942 events
August 1942 events